The 2002 Dutch Figure Skating Championships took place between 22 and 23 December 2001 in Groningen. Skaters competed in the disciplines of ladies' singles and ice dancing.

Senior results

Ladies

Ice dancing

External links
 results

Dutch Figure Skating Championships
2001 in figure skating
Dutch Figure Skating Championships, 2002
2002 in Dutch sport
Sports competitions in Groningen (city)